Helenstowe Nunnery was an Anglo-Saxon nunnery at Abingdon in the English county of Berkshire (now Oxfordshire).

Helenstowe is said to have been founded by a certain Lady Cilla in the 670s. It was probably the nuns' part of a double monastery along with her brother's abbey on Boar's Hill. It is believed to have stood on the site of St Helen's Church.

References

Monasteries in Berkshire
Monasteries in Oxfordshire
Nunneries in England
Anglo-Saxon monastic houses
Abingdon-on-Thames
Former structures on the River Thames